Palau Sant Jordi is an indoor sporting arena and multi-purpose installation that is part of the Olympic Ring complex located in Barcelona, Catalonia, Spain. Designed by the Japanese architect Arata Isozaki, it was opened in 1990. The maximum seating capacity of the arena is 17,960. It is the largest indoor arena in Spain.

The Palau Sant Jordi was one of the main venues of the 1992 Summer Olympics hosting the artistic gymnastics, handball final, and volleyball final events. Today, it is used for a variety of indoor sport events as well as for concerts and other cultural activities, due to its great flexibility.

Sporting events

The arena was the venue of the 1995 IAAF World Indoor Championships in Athletics.

It was the venue of three EuroLeague Final Fours in 1998, 2003, and 2011. It also hosted the EuroBasket 1997, from the quarterfinals on, and the 2012 Copa del Rey.

The final of 2000 Davis Cup was the 89th edition of the most important tournament between nations in men's tennis. Spain defeated Australia at Palau Sant Jordi on 8–10 December, giving Spain their first title. The arena also hosted the finals of 2009 Davis Cup between Spain and Czech Republic with the victory for the Spaniards 5–0.

Palau Sant Jordi was the main venue of the 2003 FINA World Championships. A temporary, regulation swimming pool was installed for the occasion. It played the same role for the 2013 FINA World Championships, since the city of Barcelona hosted the Championships again after 10 years.

It was one of six sites that hosted the 2013 World Men's Handball Championship including the final. It was also one of six sites to host the 2014 FIBA Basketball World Cup in Spain.

On 5 October 2016, the arena hosted an NBA preseason game between the Oklahoma City Thunder and local team FC Barcelona Regal.

It will host matches for the 2028 European Men's Handball Championship.

Sant Jordi Club
The 3,000-seat Sant Jordi Club opened in 2007 and is located behind the main building.

Concerts

See also
Estadi Olímpic Lluís Companys
List of indoor arenas in Spain
List of tennis stadiums by capacity

Notes

References

External links

Indoor arenas in Catalonia
Indoor arenas in Spain
Basketball venues in Spain
Volleyball venues in Spain
Handball venues in Spain
Venues of the 1992 Summer Olympics
Olympic gymnastics venues
Olympic handball venues
Olympic volleyball venues
Sports venues completed in 1990
Event venues established in 1990
Indoor track and field venues
1990 establishments in Catalonia
Sports venues in Barcelona
Arata Isozaki buildings
2000 Davis Cup
Athletics in Barcelona